Timothy Charles Lewis (born November 10, 1962) is an American racewalker. He competed in the men's 20 kilometres walk at the 1988 Summer Olympics.

References

1962 births
Living people
Athletes (track and field) at the 1987 Pan American Games
Athletes (track and field) at the 1988 Summer Olympics
American male racewalkers
Olympic track and field athletes of the United States
Place of birth missing (living people)
Pan American Games medalists in athletics (track and field)
Pan American Games silver medalists for the United States
Medalists at the 1987 Pan American Games